Donald Edwin Nuechterlein (June 20, 1925 – July 7, 2022) was an American diplomat and academic who was a professor of international relations at the Federal Executive Institute, Charlottesville, Virginia, from 1968 to 1988.

Early life
Nuechterlein was born in Saginaw, Michigan, on June 20, 1925, the son of Edwin William and Laura Anna Nuechterlein. He earned bachelor's master's and PhD degrees from the University of Michigan.

Career
He was professor of international relations at the Federal Executive Institute, Charlottesville, Virginia, from 1968 to 1988.

He held the following titles with the United States government:

 U.S. Government, assistant reports officer in Berlin, Germany, 1946–47
 U.S. Department of State, Washington, DC, research analyst, 1952–54
 U.S. Embassy in Reykjavik, Iceland, 1954–56
 Desk Officer in Washington, D.C., 1957–60
 Cultural Attache, U.S. Embassy in Bangkok, Thailand, 1960–63
 U.S. Department of Defense, Washington, DC, senior staff officer, 1964–68

He was professor of international relations at the Federal Executive Institute, Charlottesville, Virginia, from 1968 to 1988.

In 1948, he married Mildred Virginia Usak, and they had four children, Jan, Jill, Jeffrey, Jonathan.

He was a fellow of the Rockefeller Foundation.

Personal life and death
In 1995, his son, lawyer Jeffrey Donald Nuechterlein, married Abigail Riggs Spangler, daughter of billionaire businessman Clemmie Spangler. He died in Charlottesville, Virginia on July 7, 2022, at the age of 97.

References

External links
 donaldnuechterlein.com

1925 births
2022 deaths
People from Saginaw, Michigan
University of Michigan alumni
Academics from Michigan
American foreign policy writers
American male non-fiction writers
Rockefeller Fellows
United States Navy personnel of World War II
Cultural attachés
American expatriates in Germany
American expatriates in Iceland
American expatriates in Thailand